Pyrausta albogrisea is a moth in the family Crambidae. It is found in Colombia.

References

Moths described in 1913
albogrisea
Moths of South America